5 år – som vi så dem (Five Years, As We Saw Them) is a Norwegian documentary from 1947, directed by Per G. Jonson and Bredo Lind.

The film is about Norwegians' efforts outside Norway during the Second World War II. King Haakon VII and Crown Prince Olav are seen in the film. Ola Isene is the narrator, and other voices in the film are Hartvig Kiran, Reidar Lunde, Hans Jacob Nilsen, and Lars Nordrum.

References

External links
 
 5 år – som vi så dem at the National Library of Norway

Norwegian black-and-white films
1947 films
Norwegian documentary films
1940s Norwegian-language films
1947 documentary films